DWFB (954 AM) Radyo Pilipinas is a radio station owned and operated by the government-controlled Philippine Broadcasting Service. Its studios and offices are located at Mariano Marcos State University - College of Teacher Education Campus, Laoag, while its transmitter is located at Mariano Marcos State University - Main Campus, Batac. The station airs from 4:45 AM to 10 PM on weekdays and 6 AM to 10 PM on weekends.

References

External links
 PBS Website

Radio stations in Ilocos Norte
News and talk radio stations in the Philippines
Radio stations established in 1974
Philippine Broadcasting Service